Juan Carlos Cuenca (born December 30, 1987) popularly known as Jake Cuenca is a Filipino-American actor and model. Born in San Jose, California and was raised in Manila, Philippines. He also played for United Football League Division 2 sides Team Socceroo FC.

Entertainment career
At the age of nine, Cuenca was discovered by the talent scout Arvin Bentonon for Cosmo Modeling Agency. Soon after, he made several television and print commercials including endorsements for Safeguard, Coke and Globe Telecom. At the age of eleven, he had cameo roles in movies such as Takbo Barbara Takbo and Panday in 1998. It was followed by another cameo in the 1999 film version of Wansapanataym. 

In 2003, he returned to show business under GMA Network and appeared in the youth-oriented drama series, Click, where he was welcomed as a member of its third batch. Cuenca played a number of supporting roles in Hanggang Kailan, Forever in My Heart and the fifth season of Love to Love. In 2005, he starred as Kahlil in the hit fantasy series Encantadia. He also appeared in the ninth season of Love to Love titled "Miss Match". In 2006, he starred as one of the wizards in the fantasy-themed television series, Majika, which became his last TV series on GMA.

 
After transferring to ABS-CBN in 2006, he appeared in an episode of Love Spell, "Home Switch Home".

In 2007, he became part of the cast of the network's soap opera Sana Maulit Muli, his first primetime drama series on the network. Also, he starred as his first leading role  in Sineserye Presents: Natutulog Ba Ang Diyos?. He portrayed Andrew - a rich, spoiled and irresponsible teen guy who is secretly in love with the leading actress Roxanne Guinoo. Later, he was cast on the fantasy series Lastikman. He appeared in total 14 shows of ABS-CBN within 1 year (from late 2006 to the entire year 2007).

In 2008, he landed on the lead role in ABS-CBN's action series remake of Palos with Cesar Montano. Besides, he also played the main role of Kiko with Shaina Magdayao in Your song Presents: A million miles away. In the mini-series, he played Kiko -an  assistant of Lizzie's father who asks him become a "babysitter" for Lizzie and her mean boyfriend, under the instruction of Lizzie's father. However, it is revealed that Kiko is secretly in love with her for a long time.

In 2009, he starred in Tayong Dalawa  alongside Kim Chiu, where he gained recognition from audience and criticism. He portrayed David Dave Garcia Jr (Dave), a jack-a-danny and a soldier in the Philippine army. In the series, he had the triangle love story with Gerald Anderson and Kim Chiu.The TV hit was aired on TV in many countries in Asia such as: Singapore, Malaysia, Vietnam, Brunei, Cambodia... and in Africa... In the same year, he appeared on Precious Hearts Romances Presents: My Cheating Heart alongside kapamilya leading lady Cristine Reyes.

In 2010, he portrayed the role of Alejandro in the Filipino remake of Rubi with the biggest Kapamilya leading ladies Angelica Panganiban and Shaina Magdayao. That same year, he also starred as Elias Paniki in the fourth story of the 'Agimat' series  Elias Paniki alongside Sam Pinto and Xian Lim.

In 2011, he was among the main cast in the Filipino remake of Green Rose as Edward. It is a remake of the Korean drama of the same title. The film had also the appearance of top stars including Jericho Rosales, Anne Curtis and Alessandra De Rossi. After that, he portrayed Darmo Adarna, the well-known superhero of Filipino cartoon in Wansapanataym:Darmo Adarna, opposite Yen Santos. Different from a super-powered boy with a giant bird in the comic, Darmo Adarna in the show  grows up as an overweight loser who is magically transformed into a muscle-bound hero.

In 2012, he played the role of Paul Raymundo in Kung Ako'y Iiwan Mo alongside two female stars Shaina Magdayao and Bangs Garcia, The triangle love and  OFW-Workers's story in the film attracted the interest of audience. The series reached top rating in 2012 although it was aired in the afternoon. Also that same year, he was part of the primetime series Kahit Puso'y Masugatan as Rafael - a young and charming photographer with a tragedy life. It is really the challenging role for him because of his inner struggles in the film.

In 2013, he portrayed the role of Luis Sancuevas in the Filipino remake of Maria Mercedes with leading lady Jessy Mendiola and Jason Abalos.

In 2014, he starred as the main antagonist by playing the role of Franco in the epic drama series Ikaw Lamang with an ensemble cast.

In 2015–2016, he portrayed the role of Juan, one of the Samonte brothers in the romantic drama series Pasión de amor, a Philippine adaptation of Telemundo-produced Pasión de Gavilanes, one of the most famous TV series in the year with top rating.

In the field of cinema, Jake was seen in mainstream films: In the Name of Love, Status: It's complicated, My Neighbor's Wife, Villa Estrella, Tuhog....  and featured in indie films such as:  H.I.V.: Si Heidi, Si Ivy at si V (2010) - a film about AIDS, Nuwebe (2013), a film about child sexual abuse which gained local and international awards, Lihis (2013), Mulat (2014).... Jake won his first best actor award at the International Film Festival Manhattan (IFFM) in New York in 2014 for his performance in Diane Ventura's Mulat (Awaken), the same movie that recently won for him his second best actor at the 2016 World Cinema Festival in Copacabana, Brazil.

On the night of October 9, 2021, the actor's black Jeep Wrangler collided with a Mandaluyong police car that had set up a checkpoint along Shaw Boulevard for a buy-bust operation. The police, in plain-clothing, reported that Jake did not stop for inspection and instead had rammed through the checkpoint barriers, prompting the police to chase the actor until his tires were shot and was cornered at West Capitol Road in Pasig. A stray bullet had accidentally hit a Grab delivery driver, who is currently in stable condition as of listing. Jake stated that he was afraid to stop for inspection at the checkpoint as the police were in plain-clothes. He was allowed to leave the police precinct at 5 AM the next day and is currently undergoing a medical check-up. He will be facing charges of reckless imprudence resulting to damage to property.

Filmography

Television

Film

Digital

Accolades

Sporting career
Cuenca is a sports enthusiast, even during his younger days. Due to a weight problem he encountered as a child, he was determined to play sports more when he grew up. Although he has done boxing and mixed martial arts, he is mainly a football player, playing twice a week. As an elementary and high school student, Cuenca played as a football varsity player for PAREF Southridge School.

In October 2011, he signed up for Team Socceroo F.C., which at that time played as a guest club in the 2011–12 United Football Cup, and later entered in the United Football League Division 2. He is yet to play for the first team as showbiz commitments have not permitted him to do so.

Cuenca has also shown interest to try out for the Philippines in international competitions.

References

External links
 

1987 births
Living people
Filipino male child actors
Filipino male film actors
Filipino male models
Filipino male television actors
American expatriates in the Philippines
American male television actors
American models of Filipino descent
Association football forwards
Male actors from Metro Manila
Male actors from San Jose, California
Spanish expatriates in the Philippines
People from Ilocos Norte
Team Socceroo F.C. players
Association football players not categorized by nationality
GMA Network personalities
ABS-CBN personalities
Star Magic
TV5 (Philippine TV network) personalities